is a Japanese actress who is affiliated with Office Matsuda. She graduated from Shakujii High School.

Filmography

TV series

Films

References

External links
 Official profile at Office Matsuda 

Japanese actresses
1978 births
Living people
People from Tokyo